John Grim may refer to:
 John Grim (baseball), American catcher in Major League Baseball
 John Allen Grim, co-founder and co-director of the Forum on Religion and Ecology at Yale University